Gideon Mwiti Irea (born 6 December 1960) was a member of Parliament in Kenya. He represented Imenti Central constituency.

Education

Mwiti Irea holds a Bachelor of Arts  from the Daystar University and a degree in Public Relations from the Institute of Commercial Management (ICM-UK).

Political life

Mwiti Irea won the Imenti Central Parliamentary seat during the 2013 Kenyan general elections via the Alliance Party of Kenya. As of February 2015, he had made 56 contributions at the floor of the house.

Rape allegations

It is alleged that Mwiti Irea assaulted and raped a journalist in his office on March 22, 2015. He was charged in court on April 2, 2015 and was accused of subjecting a former journalist to an HIV test and then later assaulting her.

References 

Kenyan politicians
Living people
1960 births